Montfort Hall is a home and registered historic landmark located in the Boylan Heights neighborhood of Raleigh, North Carolina. It is one of the few mansions in Raleigh that survived during the American Civil War era. The house was built for William Montfort Boylan in 1858 and is an example of Italianate architecture. The centerpiece of the house's interior is a rotunda supported by four Corinthian columns and lit by a stained glass window located on the roof. Montfort Hall was listed on the National Register of Historic Places in 1978 as Montford Hall and is a Raleigh Historic Landmark. The building is currently being developed into a 10-room boutique inn.

History
William Montfort Boylan, known as “Buck,” was the youngest son of prominent Raleigh businessman, William Boylan. The younger Boylan was born in the former home of Joel Lane after his father purchased the Wakefield Plantation in 1818. In addition to Wakefield, the senior Boylan owned plantations in neighboring Johnston and Chatham counties and in Mississippi, making him one of the wealthiest men in North Carolina. In 1855 Boylan deeded his son William  of Wakefield land. 

William Montfort Boylan chose William Percival to design his home in 1858. In addition to designing Montfort Hall, some of Percival's work included renovations to the State Capitol and designing the New East and New West dormitories at the University of North Carolina in Chapel Hill. William Montfort Boylan died in 1899. In 1907 the former plantation land around Montfort Hall was sold and subdivided as Boylan Heights, one of Raleigh's first planned suburban neighborhoods. Since then, Montfort Hall has passed through a succession of owners, but the building still retains much of its original character.

Hotel 
Montfort Hall was bought in June, 2018 by Jeff and Sarah Shepherd. Keith Shepherd and Natalia Luckyanova, founders of Imangi Studios, helped to fund the project. The property will be converted into a 10-room boutique inn.

See also
National Register of Historic Places listings in Wake County, North Carolina

References

Houses on the National Register of Historic Places in North Carolina
Houses completed in 1858
Boylan family residences
Houses in Raleigh, North Carolina
Italianate architecture in North Carolina
National Register of Historic Places in Raleigh, North Carolina